Takamala is a village in Vakaga Prefecture, Central African Republic.

History 
Around 2007, UNICEF repaired two pumps in Takamala.

On 17 January 2020, a clash between MLCJ and FPRC took place in Takamala.

Facilities 
Takamala has one public health post and one school.

References 

Populated places in Vakaga